Łańskie Lake (Polish: Jezioro Łańskie) - is a lake located in the Olsztyn Lake District, nearby the village of Łańsk, Gmina Stawiguda, Olsztyn County, Warmian-Masurian Voivodeship; in Poland. The lake is part of the Cedynia Landscape Park.

Łańskie Lake is the seventeenth deepest lake in Poland. The Łyna River flows through the lake. The forests on the eastern shore of the lake are protected by the Las Warmiński Reserve.

References

Lakes of Poland
Lakes of Warmian-Masurian Voivodeship